Neptunomonas naphthovorans is a species of bacteria. It is notable for utilising naphthalene as a sole carbon and energy source. Its type strain is NAG-2N-126.

References

Further reading
Whitman, William B., et al., eds. Bergey's manual® of systematic bacteriology. Vol. 5. Springer, 2012.
Dworkin, Martin, and Stanley Falkow, eds. The Prokaryotes: Vol. 6: Proteobacteria: Gamma Subclass. Vol. 6. Springer, 2006.

External links
LPSN
WORMS entry
Type strain of Neptunomonas naphthovorans at BacDive -  the Bacterial Diversity Metadatabase

Oceanospirillales
Bacteria described in 1999